The Knife River is a  tributary of the Snake River in east-central Minnesota in the United States. It is one of three streams in Minnesota with this name. Its name is a translation from the Dakota Isaanti. Knife Lake and Santee Sioux are named after this river. In turn Isanti County is named after the Santee Sioux.

Course
The Knife River with its tributaries drains a  area of Mille Lacs and Kanabec counties. At Mora, MN, the river has a mean annual discharge of 63 cubic feet per second.

Associated lakes and tributaries
Only one lake is associated with the Knife River: Knife Lake. No major tributaries are associated with the Knife River. However, the river served as an important trade route for the Dakota, the Ojibwe, and the Voyageurs, connecting the Mississippi River (via Mille Lacs Lake) to the St. Croix River.

See also
List of rivers of Minnesota

References

 Waters, Thomas F. (1977).  The Streams and Rivers of Minnesota.  Minneapolis: University of Minnesota Press.  .

Rivers of Minnesota
Rivers of Mille Lacs County, Minnesota
Rivers of Kanabec County, Minnesota
Tributaries of the Mississippi River